Motutunga Atoll is an atoll of the Tuamotu Archipelago in French Polynesia. It is located 17 km to the east of Tahanea Atoll.

Motutunga Atoll is roughly triangular in shape. It measures 15 km in length with a maximum width of 14 km. The reef fringing the atoll is continuous. There are no deep, navigable passes to reach the lagoon. Motutunga's lagoon has a surface of 126 km2.

Motutunga is uninhabited.

History
Motutunga Atoll was first sighted by James Cook on 13 August 1773 who named it Adventure, after the name of his own ship.

Spanish navigator Domingo de Boenechea sighted Motutunga on 9 November 1774 on ship Aguila. He named this atoll San Blas

Administration
Motutunga belongs to the commune of Anaa that also includes the associated commune of Faaite with the atoll of Faaite and the uninhabited atolls of Tahanea and Motutunga.

See also

 Desert island
 List of islands

References

External links
Oceandots
Spanish voyages
Atoll list (in French)

Atolls of the Tuamotus
Uninhabited islands of French Polynesia